FK Mažeikiai was a Lithuanian football club from city of Mažeikiai.

History 

From 1992 in Mažeikiai was founded new club ROMAR – an acronym for Romas Marcinkevičius, main investor of the club. Under Marcinkevičius club begun its rapid rise in the elite division. In 1993 ROMAR finished sixth, and in 1994 won Lithuanian championship. 1995 season Romar finished in third position but because of financial crisis that hit the club was expelled from the top division.

After ROMAR`s dissvovement was founded a new club FK Mažeikiai. They had no any ambitions, played inlowest divisions, but in 2010 they made some action to be promoted to A lyga. 9th place in A lyga in 2010 season (10 teams in A lyga) with two won matches.

In 2011 was in A lyga. In this season they was in 9th place (12 teams in A lyga). Nine won matches was good result, but club had serious financial problems and was dissolved.

Name
During its history the club has changed its name several times:
 1961 – ETG Mažeikiai
 1962 – Elektra Mažeikiai
 1973 – Atmosfera Mažeikiai
 1990 – Jovaras Mažeikiai
 1992 – FK Mažeikiai
 1992 – ROMAR Mažeikiai (new club) not FK Mažeikiai
 1995 – FK Mažeikiai
 2001 – Nafta Mažeikiai
 2003 – FK Mažeikiai

Participation in Lithuanian Championships
 2011 – 9th (A lyga)
 2010 – 9th (A lyga)
 2009 – 3rd (1 Lyga)
 2008 – 1st (2 Lyga West)
 2007 – 4th (2 Lyga North)
 2006 – 3rd (2 Lyga North)
 2005 – 4th (2 Lyga North)

References 

Football clubs in Lithuania
Association football clubs established in 1947
1947 establishments in Lithuania